Nephrotoma tenuis is a species of large crane fly in the family Tipulidae.

Subspecies
These two subspecies belong to the species Nephrotoma tenuis:
 Nephrotoma tenuis fuscostigmosa Alexander
 Nephrotoma tenuis tenuis

References

Tipulidae
Articles created by Qbugbot
Insects described in 1863